The 2012 season was the club's 39th year since its establishment and its 7th consecutive season in the 1st division. The team was predicted to finish in 4th place before the season; after a difficult season the team ended up in 10th place, narrowly avoiding relegation by a win in the last round.

Willum Þór Þórsson was appointed manager at the start of the season, but his association with the club would be broken off in July after a disappointing season. Gunnar Einarsson former assistant manager was appointed interim manager until the end of the season along with Davíð Snorri Jónasson as his assistant.

Squad

First team squad

Source : 1st Division squad 2012

Transfers

Players In

Players Out

Loans in

Loans Out

Pre-season
Leiknir started the pre-season with a couple of impressive results in Reykjavik Cup against rather strong teams. In their first match Leiknir defeated Víkingur R. 2–1. Leiknir followed that win by defeating their rivals ÍR 3–0. Next game they lost 6–3 to KR in an exciting match. Their last match against Fram finished 1–1 leaving Leiknir in 3rd place in their group, level on points with KR but with a weaker goal difference and therefore not qualifying from the group. Fram went on to win the cup.
Leiknir finished 5th in their group in the League Cup.

Reykjavik Cup

Matches

League Cup

Table

Matches

1st Division

League table

Results summary

Matches

Last updated: 22 September 2012Source: KSI.is

Icelandic Cup

Matches

Statistics

Appearances and goals

|-

Clean sheets
Includes all competitive matches.
{| class="wikitable" style="font-size: 95%; text-align: center;"
|-
!width=15|
!width=15|
!width=15|
!width=15|
!width=150|Name
!width=80|1st Division
!width=80|Cup
!width=80|League Cup
!width=80|Reykjavik Cup
!width=80|Total
!width=80|Games
!width=80|Ratio
|-
|1
|22
|GK
|
|Eyjólfur Tómasson
|3
|0
|0
|1
|4
|23
|0,174
|-
|2
|22
|GK
|
|Ásgeir Þór Magnússon
|1
| –
| –
| –
|1
|11
|0,091
|-
|3
|1
|GK
|
|Þorvaldur Rúnarsson
| –
| –
|1
| –
|1
|0+2
|0,5
|-
|colspan="4"|
|TOTALS
|4
|0
|1
|1
|6
|34
|0,176

Goals Conceded
Includes all competitive matches.
{| class="wikitable" style="font-size: 95%; text-align: center;"
|-
!width=15|
!width=15|
!width=15|
!width=15|
!width=150|Name
!width=80|1st Division
!width=80|Cup
!width=80|League Cup
!width=80|Reykjavik Cup
!width=80|Total Conceded
!width=80|Games
!width=80|Ratio
|-
|1
|22
|GK
|
|Eyjólfur Tómasson
|17
|3
|15
|8
|43
|23
|1,87
|-
|2
|22
|GK
|
|Ásgeir Þór Magnússon
|17
| –
| –
| –
|17
|11
|1,55
|-
|3
|1
|GK
|
|Þorvaldur Rúnarsson
| –
| –
|2
| –
|2
|0+2
|1
|-
|colspan="4"|
|TOTALS
|36
|3
|17
|8
|64
|34
|1,88

Overall
{|class="wikitable"
|-
|Games played || 35 (22 – 1st Division, 2 Icelandic Cup, 7 League Cup, 4 Reykjavik Cup)
|-
|Games won || 11 (6 – 1st Division, 1 Icelandic Cup, 2 League Cup, 2 Reykjavik Cup)
|-
|Games drawn || 10 (7 – 1st Division, 2 Icelandic Cup, 1 Reykjavik Cup)
|-
|Games lost || 14 (9 – 1st Division, 1 Icelandic Cup, 3 League Cup, 1 Reykjavik Cup)
|-
|Goals scored || 57 (33 – 1st Division, 4 Icelandic Cup, 11 League Cup, 9 Reykjavik Cup)
|-
|Goals conceded || 64 (36 – 1st Division 3 Icelandic Cup, 17 League Cup, 8 Reykjavik Cup)
|-
|Goal difference || −7 (−3 – 1st Division, +1 Icelandic Cup, −6 League Cup, +1 Reykjavik Cup)
|-
|Clean sheets || 6 (4 – 1st Division, 1 Icelandic Cup, 1 Reykjavik Cup)
|-
|Yellow cards || 68 (45 – 1st Division, 4 Icelandic Cup, 15 League Cup, 4 Reykjavik Cup)
|-
|Red cards || 4 (4 – 1st Division)
|-
|Worst discipline || Óttar Bjarni Guðmundsson (14 )
|-
|Best result(s) || W 6 – 1 (H) v Höttur – 1st Division – 13 July 2012
|-
|Worst result(s) || L 1 – 5 (H) v Þór Akureyri – 1st Division – 22 July 2012
|-
|Most appearances || Hilmar Árni Halldórsson with 34 appearances
|-
|Top scorer(s) ||  Ólafur Hrannar Kristjánsson (13 goals)
|-

Key dates
12 October 2011: Willum Þór Þórsson is appointed as the new manager on a two-year contract
25 October 2011: Andri Steinn Birgisson Joins Leiknir from Keflavík.
19 November 2011: Gunnar Einarsson rejoins Leiknir as an assistant manager
16 January 2012: Sigursteinn Gíslason former manager and a significant person to the club dies of cancer
9 May 2012: Leiknir predicted 4th place for the oncoming season by Fotbolti.net
12 May 2012: First game of the season is a 2–0 loss to Þór
22 June 2012: Leiknir get their first win of the season in the seventh round away against Víkingur Ó. 0–1
30 June 2012: Manager Willum Þór Þórsson is shown the red card in a 1–1 draw against Tindastóll, his second of the season.
7 July 2012: Leiknir hit bottom of the table after a 4–3 loss against BÍ/Bolungarvík
13 July 2012: Ólafur Hrannar Kristjánsson scores a hattrick in a 6–1 win against Höttur.
17 July 2012: Away loss against rivals ÍR 2–1. Eyjólfur Tómasson is shown the red card in the 90th minute.
1 September 2012: Leiknis faces relegation after a 2–1 away loss against Tindastóll.
3 September 2012: Willum Þór Þórsson is sacked after disappointing results, Gunnar Einarsson is appointed interim manager until the end of the season
15 September 2012: Leiknir gets out of relegation zone before the final round and gains 1 point advantage on Höttur after defeating them 3–2.
22 September 2012: Leiknir secures its place in the 1st division after a 2–0 home win against ÍR in the last round. ÍR is relegated.

References

Leiknir R